June 28 - Eastern Orthodox Church calendar - June 30

All fixed commemorations below celebrated on July 12 by Orthodox Churches on the Old Calendar.

For June 29th, Orthodox Churches on the Old Calendar commemorate the Saints listed on June 16.

Saints
 The Holy, Glorious and All-Praised Leaders of the Apostles, PeterRev. Sabine Baring-Gould (M.A.). "S. PETER, AP. M. (A.D. 65.)." In: The Lives of the Saints. Volume the Sixth: June. London: John C. Nimmo, 1897. pp. 419-432. and Paul (67)
 Saint Mary of Jerusalem, mother of Apostle Mark (1st century)

Pre-Schism Western saints
 Saint Benedicta (Beata), sister of Sts Augustine and Sanctian, all three were born in Spain but went to France and were martyred in Sens under Aurelian (273)  (see also: September 6 )
 Saints Marcellus and Anastasius, Martyred in Bourges in France (274)
 Saint Syrus of Genoa, priest and later Bishop of Genoa in Italy from c. 324 to c. 380, he is the main patron of the city (c. 380)
 Saint Cassius of Narni, Bishop of Narni in Italy (558)
 Saint Cocha (Coecha), Abbess of Ross-Benchuir, in County Clare, Ireland (6th century)
 Saints Salome and Judith, anchoresses at Oberalteich Abbey (dedicated to Saints Peter and Paul), in Germany (9th century)
 Saint Hemma of Gurk (Gemma, Emma), a widow, she founded the monastery of Gurk in Carinthia in Austria and became a nun there (1045)

Post-Schism Orthodox saints
 Saint Gregory (Kallides), Metropolitan of Herakleia and Raidestos (1925)  (see also: July 25 )
 Venerable Paisios the Athonite (1994)  (see also: July 12 )

Other commemorations
 Uncovering of the relics of Saint Nicander of Pskov, hermit (1686)
 Icon of the Mother of God of Kasperov (1853-1855)  (see also: October 1 )
 Synaxis of the Saints of Lesbos.
 Repose of Archbishop Andrew (Rymarenko) of Rockland (New Diveyevo Monastery) (1978)

Icon gallery

Notes

References

Sources
 June 29/July 12. Orthodox Calendar (PRAVOSLAVIE.RU).
 July 12 / June 29. HOLY TRINITY RUSSIAN ORTHODOX CHURCH (A parish of the Patriarchate of Moscow).
 June 29. OCA - The Lives of the Saints.
 June 29. The Year of Our Salvation - Holy Transfiguration Monastery, Brookline, Massachusetts. 
 The Autonomous Orthodox Metropolia of Western Europe and the Americas (ROCOR). St. Hilarion Calendar of Saints for the year of our Lord 2004. St. Hilarion Press (Austin, TX). p. 48.
 The Twenty-Ninth Day of the Month of June. Orthodoxy in China.
 June 29. Latin Saints of the Orthodox Patriarchate of Rome.
 The Roman Martyrology. Transl. by the Archbishop of Baltimore. Last Edition, According to the Copy Printed at Rome in 1914. Revised Edition, with the Imprimatur of His Eminence Cardinal Gibbons. Baltimore: John Murphy Company, 1916. pp. 188–189.
 Rev. Richard Stanton. A Menology of England and Wales, or, Brief Memorials of the Ancient British and English Saints Arranged According to the Calendar, Together with the Martyrs of the 16th and 17th Centuries. London: Burns & Oates, 1892. pp. 294–294.
Greek Sources
 Great Synaxaristes:  29 ΙΟΥΝΙΟΥ. ΜΕΓΑΣ ΣΥΝΑΞΑΡΙΣΤΗΣ.
  Συναξαριστής. 29 Ιουνίου. ECCLESIA.GR. (H ΕΚΚΛΗΣΙΑ ΤΗΣ ΕΛΛΑΔΟΣ). 
  29 Ιουνίου. Αποστολική Διακονία της Εκκλησίας της Ελλάδος (Apostoliki Diakonia of the Church of Greece).
  29/06/2018. Ορθόδοξος Συναξαριστής. 
Russian Sources
  12 июля (29 июня). Православная Энциклопедия под редакцией Патриарха Московского и всея Руси Кирилла (электронная версия). (Orthodox Encyclopedia - Pravenc.ru).
  29 июня по старому стилю / 12 июля по новому стилю. Русская Православная Церковь - Православный церковный календарь на 2017 год.
  29 июня (ст.ст.) 12 июля 2014 (нов. ст.). Русская Православная Церковь Отдел внешних церковных связей. (DECR).

June in the Eastern Orthodox calendar